The Tennessee State Tigers basketball team represents Tennessee State University (TSU) in Nashville, Tennessee, United States. The school's team currently competes in the NCAA Division I's Ohio Valley Conference. They play their home games at the Gentry Complex and are led by fourth-year head coach Brian "Penny" Collins.

While they were a member of the NAIA, they were three time national champions (1957, 1958, 1959). TSU was the first team to win three consecutive basketball national championships at any level of college basketball – a feat only repeated once as of 2021, by Kentucky State (1970, 1971, 1972) The 1957 championship made TSU the first historically black college to win a national championship. The team was coached by Harold Hunter from 1960 to 1968. Hunter still holds the record as the second-winningest men's basketball coach in Tennessee State's history. Hunter had succeeded outgoing coach John McLendon, who left in 1959.

Seventeen former Tennessee State Tigers have played in the NBA; the best known are Ben Warley, Robert Covington, Dick Barnett, John Barnhill, Truck Robinson, Anthony Mason and Carlos Rogers.

Postseason results

NCAA Division I Tournament results
The Tigers have appeared in two NCAA Division I Tournaments. Their combined record is 0–2.

NCAA Division II Tournament results
The Tigers have appeared in seven NCAA Division II Tournaments. Their record is 18–8.

NAIA Tournament results
The Tigers have appeared in seven NAIA Tournaments. Their combined record is 23–4 and are three time national champions (1957, 1958, 1959). Those same teams were later announced as inductees into the Naismith Memorial Basketball Hall of Fame on April 6, 2019, with those teams being "the first collegiate team to win back-to-back-to-back championships."

CIT results
The Tigers have appeared in three CollegeInsider.com Postseason Tournaments (CIT). Their combined record is 0–3. They accepted an invitation to the 2020 CIT before it was cancelled amid the COVID-19 pandemic.

References

External links